San Marino competed at the 2022 World Aquatics Championships in Budapest, Hungary from 17 June to 3 July.

Artistic swimming

San Marino entered two artistic swimmers.

Women

Open water swimming

San Marino qualified one female open water swimmer.

Women

Swimming

San Marino entered three swimmers.

Men

Women

References

Nations at the 2022 World Aquatics Championships
San Marino at the World Aquatics Championships
2022 in Sammarinese sport